Hover Strike: Unconquered Lands is a shooter video game developed and published by Atari Corporation exclusively for the Atari Jaguar CD in North America and Europe on October 23, 1995. A remake of Hover Strike for the Atari Jaguar, it was created by most of the original team who worked on the original game and both titles share the same overall plot, where the Terrakian alien race seized control of a colonized foreign planet and players are tasked with piloting an armed hovercraft vehicle in an attempt of rescuing the captured colonists and destroy the invading forces from the planet's surface before the Federation armada arrives.

As with the original game, Hover Strike: Unconquered Lands received mixed reception from critics after its initial release and many felt divided in regards to multiple aspects of the game such as the presentation, visuals, sound and gameplay.

Gameplay 

 For further information about the gameplay, see: Gameplay of Hover Strike
Hover Strike: Unconquered Lands is a futuristic semi-open three-dimensional shooter game like its original predecessor, where the players take control of a heavily armed hovercraft vehicle across multiple missions set on a foreign planet, each one varying in terms of main objectives and thematic in order to annihilate the forces of the Terrakian Pirates from the planetary surface before the Federation's armada arrives to the location. The game's progression system, two-player mode and controls act like the original game, however a Memory Track cartridge has to be present for game saves. The remake features new missions and enemies not found within the original title, along with improved graphics, an arranged CD-quality soundtrack, among other extras.

Development and release 
Hover Strike: Unconquered Lands made its first appearance on the showfloor of E3 1995 and was in development as early as August 1995 and was originally listed for a September/Q3 1995 release. It would later be previewed in some video game magazines and the game was released on October 23, 1995 for the Jaguar CD add-on. Most of the development team from the original Hover Strike on the Jaguar were also involved in the production of the remake. Years after its release, the game's source code would be released by defunct Jaguar Sector II website under a CD compilation for PC titled Jaguar Source Code Collection on August 24, 2008.

Reception 

Like the original game, Hover Strike: Unconquered Lands received mixed reception from critics after its release.

References

External links 
 
 Hover Strike: Unconquered Lands at AtariAge
 Hover Strike: Unconquered Lands at GameFAQs
 Hover Strike: Unconquered Lands at MobyGames

1995 video games
Atari games
Atari Jaguar CD games
Atari Jaguar-only games
Commercial video games with freely available source code
Cooperative video games
Multiplayer and single-player video games
Science fiction video games
Shooter video games
Single-player video games
Tank simulation video games
Video games developed in the United States
Video game remakes
Video games set in the future